Ghost in the Shell 2: Innocence, known in Japan as just , is a 2004 Japanese animated cyberpunk film written and directed by Mamoru Oshii. The film serves as a standalone sequel to Oshii's 1995 film Ghost in the Shell and is loosely based on the manga by Masamune Shirow.

The film was co-produced by Production I.G and Studio Ghibli for Tokuma Shoten, Nippon Television Network, Dentsu, Buena Vista Home Entertainment, Toho and D-Rights, and distributed by Toho. It was released in Japan on March 6, 2004, and was later released in the US on September 17, 2004 by Go Fish Pictures. The film's US box office performance had exceeded Go Fish Pictures' expectation.

Innocence received the 2004 Nihon SF Taisho Award. It was also in competition at the 2004 Cannes Film Festival, making it the first and only anime in history to compete for the Palme d'Or. The soundtrack for the film was released under the name Innocence O.S.T. and a related novel called Ghost in the Shell: Innocence - After the Long Goodbye was released on February 29, 2004.

Plot
The story is loosely based on Ghost in the Shell manga chapter "Robot Rondo" (with elements of "Phantom Fund"). Opening in 2032, Public Security Section 9 cybernetic operative Batou is teamed with Togusa, an agent with very few cybernetic upgrades, following the events of Ghost in the Shell.

After a series of deaths due to malfunctioning gynoids—doll-like sex robots—Section 9 is asked to investigate. As the gynoids all malfunctioned without clear cause, the deaths are believed to be premeditated murders; Batou and Togusa are sent to investigate possible terrorist or political motives. Additionally, the most recent gynoid's remains show they all contained an illegal "ghost". Section 9 concludes human sentience is being artificially duplicated onto the dolls illegally, making the robots more lifelike, and possibly acting as a motive in the murders.

Called to a homicide scene, information warfare/technology specialist Ishikawa explains the victim is Jack Walkson, a consignment officer at gynoid company LOCUS SOLUS, who may have been killed by the Yakuza. A previous Yakuza boss was recently killed by a gynoid, so Ishikawa concludes Walkson was held responsible and killed in an act of revenge. Batou and Togusa enter a Yakuza bar to question the current boss, only to be threatened by the bar occupants. Batou opens fire, killing and wounding numerous gang members, including the cyborg that murdered Walkson. The current boss then admits his predecessor was somehow involved in LOCUS SOLUS, but insists he doesn't know how.

Entering a store on his way home, Batou is then seemingly warned by the Major and shot in the arm by an unseen assailant. Caught in a firefight, Batou nearly kills the store owner in confusion, but is subdued when Ishikawa appears. While having his damaged arm replaced, Batou is informed by Ishikawa that his e-brain was hacked, causing him to shoot himself and attack the store occupants. Ishikawa explains that Batou was hacked in order to cause further scandal following his Yakuza assault in an attempt to stop the Section 9 investigation.

Batou and Togusa then head for the mansion of Kim, a soldier-turned-hacker with an obsession with dolls. Seemingly dead, Kim soon reveals he "lives" inside the shell of a human-sized marionette, and discusses philosophy with his visitors. Kim admits ties to LOCUS SOLUS, divulging that the company has secret headquarters in international waters. Warned again by the Major, Batou realizes that Kim has secretly hacked into his and Togusa's e-brains, and is currently trapping them in a false reality. Resetting Togusa's brain, Batou subdues Kim, stating he knows Kim hacked his brain in the store.

Resolved to gather material evidence, Batou infiltrates the LOCUS SOLUS headquarters ship while Togusa remotely hacks its security systems using an unaware Kim as a proxy. The ship's security becomes aware of the hacking and retaliates with a virus that fries Kim's cyberbrain. Simultaneously, a hidden virus loads a combat program into the production-line gynoids, causing them to attack everyone aboard, easily slaughtering the poorly armed and panicked security force. As Batou fights to the ship's center, the Major then appears by controlling a gynoid remotely, helping Batou fight the gynoids and hack the ship's security.

Taking control of the ship, the Major reveals to Batou the truth about the gynoids. Hiring the Yakuza to traffic young girls, LOCUS SOLUS duplicated their consciousnesses into the gynoids, giving them human "ghosts" to make them more realistic. Batou rescues a young girl from a "ghost dubbing" machine, and she explains that Jack Walkson, having learned the truth about LOCUS SOLUS, promised to save the girls by tampering with the ghosting process. This caused the gynoids to murder their owners, allowing Walkson to attract police attention and indirectly kill the Yakuza boss. Despite Walkson's actions saving the girls, Batou objects that he also victimized the gynoids as well, causing them severe distress by giving them damaged ghosts. Having solved the case, Batou asks the Major if she's happy now. She responds that she'll always be beside him on the network, then disconnects from the gynoid.

Voice cast

Additional English voices

Epcar/Manga UK/Madman cast

 Richard Cansino as Man, Security 1, Yakuza 1
 Steve Kramer as Detective, Security 4, Security 5
 Sherry Lynn as Gynoid
 Terrence Stone as Pilot, Security 2, Shop Owner, Yakuza 3
 Michael McConnohie as Forensics Staff, Section 9 Member, Security 3
 Bob Papenbrook as Crab Man, Cyborg Doctor, Underwater Cyborg, Yakuza 2
 Stephanie Sheh as Dispatcher, Togusa's Daughter
 Kevin Seymour (as Mr. X) as Yakuza 4

Animaze/Bandai cast

 Karen Huie as Locus Solus Security System #1 (Cantonese)
 Jim Lau as Locus Solus Security System #2 (Cantonese)
 Joe Romersa as Crab Man, Undersea Cyborg
 John Snyder as Cyborg Arm Doctor
 David Vincent as SWAT Commander, Yakuza 1
 Kyle Hebert as Detective
 Roger Craig Smith as Briefing Voice, Yamadori Transport Pilot
 Sandy Fox as Togusa's Daughter

Allusions and references
Innocence contains many references to fantasy, philosophy and Zen, and addresses aesthetic and moral questions. For example, the film begins with a quotation from Auguste Villiers de l'Isle-Adam's Tomorrow's Eve from 1886: "If our Gods and our hopes are nothing but scientific phenomena, then let us admit it must be said that our love is scientific as well." Other numerous quotations in the film come from Buddha, Confucius, Descartes, the Old Testament, Meiji-era critic Saitō Ryokuu, Richard Dawkins, Max Weber, Jacob Grimm, Plato, John Milton, 14th-century playwright Zeami Motokiyo, the Tridentine Mass, and Julien Offray de La Mettrie, French Enlightenment philosopher and author of "Man a Machine".

The characters and their names contain many allusions to other older works. For example, the "Hadaly" model robots refer to a human-like robot named Hadaly featured in Tomorrow's Eve, also the book that popularized the word android. The company LOCUS SOLUS is named for the 1914 novel by Raymond Roussel, which also shares certain thematic elements with the film, such as a mansion containing tableaux vivants. The police forensic specialist, Haraway, is most likely named for Donna Haraway, feminist author of A Cyborg Manifesto. Haraway's character is likely based on Susan Calvin from Asimov's Robot series. The Robot series is also referenced in the film's androids as they comply with a modified version of Asimov's Third Law of Robotics.

Dolls are also an important motif in Innocence; many have "spirits" of some sort, but at the same time are not quite human. They are based on the art of Hans Bellmer, a dollmaker famous for his disturbing, erotic ball-jointed female dolls.

The parade sequence is based on a religious procession and a temple in Taiwan.

In the 2009 English dub, the murdered consignment inspector is called Jacques Vaucanson. His namesake was an 18th-century French inventor who created automata in the image of man and of animals.

Production
Innocence had a production budget of approximately $20 million (approximately 2 billion yen). To raise the sum, Production I.G studio's president, Mitsuhisa Ishikawa, asked Studio Ghibli's president, Toshio Suzuki, to co-produce. Polygon Pictures produced the 3DCG in the film.

Director's ideas
On the origins of the movie, director Mamoru Oshii says he didn't envision it solely as a sequel to Ghost in the Shell. He said, "I had a dozen ideas, linked to my views on life, my philosophy, that I wanted to include in this film ... I attacked Innocence as a technical challenge; I wanted to go beyond typical animation limits, answer personal questions and at the same time appeal to filmgoers." During production, the first decision Oshii made was to not make Motoko Kusanagi the main character and instead make it a story about someone searching for her. Oshii chose to make the movie have a different tone and feel from the original.

Oshii traveled the world in order to find inspirations for the film. Oshii based the appearance on the dolls created by Hans Bellmer he saw at the International Center of Photography in New York. He credited Jean-Luc Godard for the idea of including quotes by other authors: "[The texts] ... give a certain richness to cinema because the visual is not all there is. Thanks to Godard, the spectator can concoct his own interpretation ... The image associated with the text is a unifying act that aims at renewing cinema, that  it take to new dimensions."

Oshii noted his attention to detail might be particularly Japanese: "I get absorbed in the finer points – like what the back of a bottle label looks like when you see it through the glass [demonstrates with a bottle of mineral water]. That's very Japanese, I suppose. I want people to go back to the film again and again to pick up things they missed the first time." Describing the overall look, the director said, "The film is set in the future, but it's looking at present-day society. And as I said, there's an autobiographical element as well. I'm looking back at some of the things I liked as a child — the 1950s cars and so on. Basically, I wanted to create a different world — not a future world."

The dog Gabriel, looking once more like the only "real" being, makes a key appearance, as in many of Oshii's movies. A scene with Batou feeding his dog is echoed in Ash in Avalon (2001). He explained the reason why all his films feature a basset hound—his companion in real life: "This body you see before you is an empty shell. The dog represents my body. Human beings can be free only if they free themselves from their bodies. When I am playing around with my dog, I forget that I am a human being, and it's only then that I feel free."

As for the state of art and animation, Oshii had this to say:

I think that Hollywood is relying more and more on 3D imaging like that of Shrek. The strength behind Japanese animation is based in the designer's pencil. Even if he mixes 2D, 3D, and computer graphics, the foundation is still 2D. Only doing 3D does not interest me.

On the overall message of the film, the director said "This movie ... concludes that all forms of life – humans, animals and robots – are equal. In this day and age when everything is uncertain, we should all think about what to value in life and how to coexist with others." On his narrative intentions Oshii comments: "I had a bigger budget than for Ghost in the Shell. I also had more time to prepare it. Yet despite the economic leeway, abundant details and orientations, it was still important to tell an intimate story."

Title change
In order to better market the film outside Japan, the Ghost in the Shell 2 moniker was added to the title of the film, with Innocence becoming the subtitle. Some fans saw this as conflicting with Oshii's statements that the film wasn't, in actuality, a standard Hollywood-esque sequel, and was able to, and intended to, stand on its own.

English-language dub
When Go Fish Pictures released Innocence, they released it subtitled, without English dubbing, a controversial choice since every Ghost in the Shell anime released by Manga Entertainment outside of Japan had been dubbed. Anime News Network announced Manga Entertainment UK's co-production of an English dub with Madman Entertainment, their Australian distributor and longtime partner, and Richard Epcar's (the voice of Batou) Epcar Entertainment studio for the dubbing. This was the first dub Manga UK had produced since X in 1999 and the first dub Madman produced. This dub was released in the UK by Manga and in Australia by Madman Entertainment (using the Go Fish Pictures transfer). Bandai Entertainment under license from Paramount and DreamWorks created a second dub for the North American market using most of the voice actors from the Manga/Madman version making some changes to the cast and production team and using Animaze's studio.

Related media

Soundtrack

The soundtrack was composed by Kenji Kawai, who also did Ghost in the Shell soundtrack. As he expressed in the liner notes, he agreed with Mamoru Oshii that the soundtrack pattern itself somewhat after "would follow the music from the original film." Additionally, Oshii made specific requests for "a huge music box," a "jazzy theme," and a "reprise of the song 'Follow Me'".

The music box, heard in the "Doll House" tracks, was procured from Sankyo Shoji. Wanting it to sound as if played in a huge space, Kenji Kawai had the music box recorded in studio, and then played back in the underground quarry of Ohya with four speakers and two subwoofers, where it was recorded with eight microphones.

The minyoh singers chorus, heard in the "Chants" in the first movie, and in the "Ballade of Puppets" in Innocence, was expanded to include 75 performers, which proved challenging to record. The session lasted for 14 straight hours.

"Follow Me" is a reprise of a song originally interpreted by Demis Roussos in 1982. The music is based on Joaquín Rodrigo's Concierto de Aranjuez, with lyrics by Herbert Kretzmer and Hal Shaper.

Novel
A novel by Masaki Yamada called  serves as a prequel, taking place just before the film and told from Batou's perspective as he searches for his dog Gabriel (Gabu). It was published by Tokuma Shoten on February 29, 2004, and the English-language version was published by Viz Media in the US in October 2005. Viz media later released a four-volume Ani-manga boxset in April 2005.

Music Anthology
It consists of music videos from Production I.G.

Reception
Review aggregator website Rotten Tomatoes reported that 64% of critics have given a positive review based on 99 reviews, with an average rating of 6.3/10. The consensus states: "The animation is lovely, but the plot is complex to the point of inscrutability, leaving Ghost in the Shell 2: Innocence both original and numbing." On Metacritic, it has a weighted average score of 66 out of 100 based on 27 critics, indicating "generally favorable reviews".

The film was praised by Manohla Dargis of the New York Times, who wrote "Innocence doesn't just reveal a wealth of visual enchantments; it restates the case that there can and should be more to feature-length animations than cheap jokes, pathos and pandering." In contrast, criticism rests upon a number of factors, often cited to be overly heavy on philosophical dialogue and thus hard to follow, and its ending has been described as weak and unmeaningful in the arc of character development. Helen McCarthy in 500 Essential Anime Movies praises the quality script and direction, stating that "it's a challenging film, but it's one of the best anime ever".

Accolades
Honored best sci-fi film at the 2004 Nihon SF Taisho Awards, Innocence competed at the 2004 Cannes Film Festival, only the sixth animated film to be featured at Cannes ever. Along with Persepolis, it was the only animated feature to be screened in the official selection, competing for the Palme d'Or that year. (The eventual winner was Fahrenheit 9/11.)

Release

Japan
The movie was released on VHS and DVD by Buena Vista Home Entertainment Japan (later Walt Disney Studios Japan) on September 15, 2004. A UMD version was later released in 2005, and an "International Version" DVD was released on September 7, 2005, which contained multi-language subtitles. the movie was released on Blu-ray Disc on December 6, 2006.

An "Absolute Edition" was released by Disney on Blu-Ray on August 6, 2008.

Walt Disney Studios Japan released the 4K remaster of the film on Ultra HD Blu-ray and regular Blu-Ray Disc on June 22, 2018. To tie in with this release alongside the first movie's 4K remaster's Ultra HD release. On the same day, Bandai Namco Arts and Disney teamed up to release an Ultra HD Blu-Ray combo pack containing both movies for a limited time.

North America
Innocence ranked 28th at the US box office earning $317,000 on its opening weekend in September 2004. The film eventually grossed $1 million in US box office, which completely exceeded Go Fish Pictures' profitability target.

On December 28, 2004, DreamWorks Pictures (parent company of theatrical distributor Go Fish Pictures) released Innocence on DVD in the US. Reviews immediately began appearing on Amazon and other websites criticizing the movie's subtitle track: Instead of including the overlay subtitles from the theatrical release, DreamWorks produced the DVD subtitles using closed captioning, resulting in subtitles that intruded on the movie's visual effects. In addition to reading dialogue, audiences saw cues like "Footsteps ..." or "Helicopter approaches ..." After receiving numerous complaints, DreamWorks released a statement saying that unsatisfied customers could exchange their DVDs for properly subtitled ones, postage paid; and that version 4 already had the proper subtitling.

Bandai Entertainment has released the film on Blu-ray and DVD in the US, with an English dub also featuring the cast used in Ghost in the Shell: Stand Alone Complex. Bandai had licensed the film for a short period from Paramount.

Funimation released the film on DVD and on Blu-ray combo-pack on February 7, 2017. The combo pack features the Japanese version and includes the official English audio track and subtitles, along with the special features.

United Kingdom
Manga Entertainment, which released and co-produced the first film and collaborated with Bandai Entertainment to release the TV series, released Innocence with an English dub featuring the same cast as the one used in Ghost in the Shell: Stand Alone Complex in the UK on February 27, 2006. The Manga UK dub was co-produced with long-time anime partner, Madman Entertainment who has distributed Manga UK titles in Australia since its founding in 1996. The UK English dub on the Region 1 Blu-ray disc features an audio error where the soundtrack has been pitch-shifted down, resulting in unnatural sounding deep voices and mechanical sound effects in slow motion, because the dub was produced to PAL standards rather than NTSC. This is also present on the standard DVD.

Australia
The controversy with licensing also affected its release in Australia. Although Madman licensed it through Go Fish Pictures, the English dub used is from Manga Entertainment, through which Madman have licensed all Ghost in the Shell properties. The licensing costs are extremely high due to two different licenses being in effect on the DVD release. It is unknown whether Madman will use the Manga Entertainment dub or the Bandai dub for the Blu-ray version.

References

Further reading
 Brown, Steven T., "Machinic Desires: Hans Bellmer's Dolls and the Technological Uncanny in Ghost in the Shell 2: Innocence", Mechademia 3 (2008), 222-253
 Hartlieb, Sean, "Humanity in Anime: Analyzing the Films of Mamoru Oshii", 'Chapter Nine: Innocence' (2016), 347-453 
 Monnet, Livia, "Anatomy of Permutational Desire: Perversion in Hans Bellmer and Oshii Mamoru", Mechademia 5 (2010), 285-309
 Monnet, Livia, "Anatomy of Permutational Desire, Part II: Bellmer's Dolls and Oshii's Gynoids", Mechademia 6 (2010), 153-169
 Monnet, Livia, "Anatomy of Permutational Desire, Part III: The Artificial Woman and the Perverse Structure of Modernity", Mechademia 7 (2012), 282-297

External links

 
 
 
 
 
 
 Essays on Inosensu (Ghost in the Shell 2: Innocence)
 Analyzes on Inosensu (Ghost in the Shell 2: Innocence)

2004 anime films
2004 computer-animated films
2004 science fiction films
2004 films
Bandai Entertainment anime titles
Animated cyberpunk films
Films directed by Mamoru Oshii
Films set in 2032
Funimation
Ghost in the Shell films
Go Fish Pictures films
Japanese animated science fiction films
Production I.G
Japanese sequel films
Studio Ghibli
Toho animated films
Anime films based on manga
Cyberpunk anime and manga
Manga Entertainment
Postcyberpunk
Postcyberpunk films
Japanese adult animated films
2000s American films